The African Qualification Tournament for the 2008 Men's Olympic Volleyball Tournament was held in Durban, South Africa, from 3 to 9 February 2008.

Venue
 Tongaat Hall, Durban, South Africa

Preliminary round
All times are South African Standard Time (UTC+02:00).

Pool A

|}

|}

Pool B

|}

|}

Final round
All times are South African Standard Time (UTC+02:00).

Semifinals

|}

3rd place match

|}

Final

|}

Final standing
{| class="wikitable" style="text-align:center;"
|-
!width=40|Rank
!width=180|Team
|- bgcolor=#ccffcc
|1
|style="text-align:left;"|
|- bgcolor=#dfefff
|2
|style="text-align:left;"|
|-
|3
|style="text-align:left;"|
|-
|4
|style="text-align:left;"|
|-
|rowspan=2|5
|style="text-align:left;"|
|-
|style="text-align:left;"|
|-
|rowspan=2|7
|style="text-align:left;"|
|-
|style="text-align:left;"|
|-
|rowspan=2|9
|style="text-align:left;"|
|-
|style="text-align:left;"|
|}

External links
Results at Todor66.com

Volleyball Men Africa
Olympic Qualification Men North Africa